Confidencias (English: Confidences) is a studio album released by Spanish performer Rocío Dúrcal in 1981 under the label of Ariola Records. It was written and produced by Spanish songwriter Rafael Pérez Botija. In Spain this album was released under the title La Gata (English: The Cat).

Seven singles were released from Confidencias. The first two singles, "No sirvo para estar sin ti" (I'm Not Good At Being Without You) and "La Gata Bajo la Lluvia" (The Cat In The Rain), became hits all over Latin America and in Spain. The song "La gata bajo la lluvia" was featured in the 1989 Spanish film La Blanca Paloma (The White Dove), directed by Juan Miñón and starring Antonio Banderas.

Track listing

Personnel 
Musicians
 Rocío Dúrcal – (Vocals)
 Camilo Sesto – (Lyrics of ¿Por Qué Me Tratas Así?)

Production
 Produce by: Rafael Pérez Botija.
 Words and music: Rafael Pérez Botija.
 Arrangements and Direction: Kornel Kobach y Rafael Pérez Botija.
 Label: Ariola Records (LP) and RCA Records (cassette).
 Distributor: Ariola International.

Certifications 
Source:

References 

1981 albums
Rocío Dúrcal albums
Ariola Records albums